Teen, Age (stylized as TEEN, AGE) is the second studio album by South Korean boy group Seventeen. It was released on November 6, 2017 by Pledis Entertainment with the lead single "Clap". Teen, Age was the group's 2nd No.1 on Billboard World Album Charts.

The album was later re-released as Seventeen's first special album entitled Director's Cut on February 5, 2018, with the title track "Thanks".

Track listing 
Choreography: Choi Youngjoon and Hoshi (Hoshi solely did the choreography for "13월의 춤")

Charts

Sales

Release history

References

Seventeen (South Korean band) albums
2017 albums
Korean-language albums
Hybe Corporation albums